Stanisław Paklepka, Latin Paclesius (d. Lublin 1565) was one of the first generation of Polish Calvinists, then later an Arian. At the Synods of Pińczów in 1562 Stanisław Paklepka and Gregory Paul of Brzeziny rejected the doctrine of the Trinity as a "papal" concept, without Biblical support, as also infant baptism.

References

Polish Unitarians
1565 deaths
Year of birth unknown